Gone with the Woman is a 2007 Norwegian film directed by Petter Naess, based on Erlend Loe's debut novel with the same title. It was Norway's submission to the 80th Academy Awards for the Academy Award for Best Foreign Language Film, but was not accepted as a nominee.

See also
Cinema of Norway
List of submissions to the 80th Academy Awards for Best Foreign Language Film

References

External links

2007 films
2007 romantic comedy-drama films
Films directed by Petter Næss
2000s Norwegian-language films
Norwegian romantic comedy films
2007 comedy-drama films